Kahangan (also Romanized as Kahangān and Kohangān) is a village in Padena-ye Olya Rural District, Padena District, Semirom County, Isfahan Province, Iran. At the 2006 census, its population was 882, in 256 families.

References 
3.

Populated places in Semirom County